Calliergon is a genus of moss in the order Hypnales. The species in the genus are commonly referred to as  calliergon mosses.

Species
The following species are recognised in the genus Calliergon:
Calliergon cordifolium (Hedw.) Kindb.
Calliergon giganteum (Schimp.) Kindb.
Calliergon macounii Karcz.
Calliergon megalophyllum Mikut.
Calliergon obtusifolium Karcz.
Calliergon orbicularicordatum (Renauld & Cardot) Broth.
Calliergon richardsonii (Mitt.) Kindb.
Calliergon stramineum (Brid.) Kindb.
Calliergon trifarium (F. Weber & D. Mohr) Kindb.

References

Hypnales
Moss genera